Bernhard "Hardi" Cinader  (March 30, 1919 – March 3, 2001) was a Canadian Immunologist and Professor in the Department of Immunology at the University of Toronto. He was inaugural president of the Canadian Society for Immunology (1966-1969) and the International Union of Immunological Societies (1969-1974).

Scientific career 
Cinader obtained his PhD from the University of London at the Lister Institute of Preventive Medicine in London, England in 1948 and continued to conduct research there until 1958.

He was recruited to Toronto, Canada as head of the immunochemistry subdivision of the Ontario Cancer Institute in 1958. He is considered one of the founders of Immunology research in Canada.

He was founding director of the Institute of Immunology in the Department of Biochemistry at the University of Toronto.

Cinader was founding president (1966-1969) of the Canadian Society for Immunology.

The Canadian Society for Immunology initiated the annual Berhard Cinader Award in 1987.

Research 
In England, Cinader studied the antigenic properties of tetanus, streptolysin and albumin with particular interest in enzyme-antibody interactions.

At the Ontario Cancer Institute, his studies turned to tolerance, complement and aging.

Personal life 
Cinader was a patron of native Canadian art and artists.

External links

References 

1919 births
2001 deaths
Canadian immunologists
Academic staff of the University of Toronto
Officers of the Order of Canada
Austrian expatriates in the United Kingdom
Austrian emigrants to Canada